Alli Petra Pillai is a 1959 Indian Tamil-language film directed by K. Somu and written by A. P. Nagarajan. Produced by A. Maruthakasi under the banner M. M. Productions, the film stars S. V. Sahasranamam, Pandari Bai and V. K. Ramasamy. It is a remake of the Hindi film Tonga-wali (1955).

Plot

Cast 
Credits adapted from Film News Anandan:

Production 
Besides producing the film under M. M. Productions, A. Maruthakasi also worked as lyricist. The other producers were K. V. Mahadevan (who also worked as music director), Violin Mahadevan and V. K. Muthuramalingam. The film prominently features a horse, which was brought from Mangalore by Maruthakasi. This was the only film Maruthakasi had produced and was supposed to be completed within six months; instead it took two years as Maruthakasi was busy writing lyrics and also false rumours of him not writing lyrics led to huge problems.

Soundtrack 
Music was scored by K. V. Mahadevan while the lyrics were penned by A. Maruthakasi. Two songs from the film – "Ejaman Petra Selvame" and "Paisaavai Pottu Naisaaga Vaangi" – attained popularity. The former is set in the Carnatic raga known as Vakulabharanam.

Release and reception 
Alli Petra Pillai was released on 31 July 1959. The film was a commercial failure, and made Maruthakasi face huge debts.

References

External links 
 

1950s Tamil-language films
1959 drama films
1959 films
Films scored by K. V. Mahadevan
Films with screenplays by A. P. Nagarajan
Indian drama films
Tamil remakes of Hindi films
Films directed by K. Somu